Events in the year 1905 in Bulgaria.

Incumbents

Events 
 5 October – The Old High School of Music in Ruse was inaugurated.

References 

 
1900s in Bulgaria
Years of the 20th century in Bulgaria
Bulgaria
Bulgaria